Resumen de acompañar la parte con la guitarra, printed in 1714, is the earliest of three collections of music for five-course guitar, composed and arranged by Santiago de Murcia.

Resumen de acompañar is dedicated to Jacome Francisco Andriani, knight of the Order of St. James and Extraordinary Envoy of the Catholic Cantons (those areas of Switzerland which remained Catholic after the Reformation), whose patronage Murcia seems to have enjoyed after the death of Maria Luisa. It also includes a recommendation from the composer Antonio Literes.

External links 
Santiago de Murcia -Resumen de acompanar. The Lute Society, UK.
Santiago of Murcia on Baroqueguitar.net

Compositions for guitar
1714 books